The 1999–2000 Northern Premier League season was the 32nd in the history of the Northern Premier League, a football competition in England. Teams were divided into two divisions; the Premier and the First.

Premier Division 

The Premier Division featured four new teams:

 Barrow relegated from the Football Conference
 Leek Town relegated from the Football Conference
 Droylsden promoted as champions of Division One
 Hucknall Town promoted as runners-up of Division One

League table

Results

Division One 

Division One featured four new teams:

 Accrington Stanley relegated from the Premier Division
 Chorley relegated from the Premier Division
 Ossett Town promoted as runners-up of the Northern Counties East Football League Premier Division
 Workington promoted as champions of the North West Counties Football League Division One

League table

Results

Promotion and relegation 

In the thirty-second season of the Northern Premier League Leigh RMI (as champions) were automatically promoted to the Football Conference. Guiseley and Winsford United were relegated to the First Division; these two clubs were replaced by relegated Conference side Altrincham, First Division winners Accrington Stanley and second placed Burscough. In the First Division Flixton and Whitley Bay left the League at the end of the season and were replaced by newly admitted North Ferriby United and Vauxhall Motors.

Cup Results
Challenge Cup: Teams from both leagues.

Lancaster City bt. Worksop Town

President's Cup: 'Plate' competition for losing teams in the NPL Cup.

Trafford bt. Whitby Town

Chairman's Cup: 'Plate' competition for losing teams in the NPL Cup.

Hyde United bt. Emley

Peter Swales Shield: Between Champions of NPL Premier Division and Winners of the NPL Cup.

Leigh Railway Mechanics Institute 2–1 Lancaster City

References

External links 
 Northern Premier League Tables at RSSSF

1999-2000
6